Rostislav Nikolaevich Yurenev (—  28 May 2002) was a Soviet and Russian film critic,  teacher, Honored Artist of the RSFSR (1969), Doctor of Arts (1961).

Biography 
Yurenev was born April 13, 1912 in Vitebsk. His father was a prominent lawyer and criminologist, served in the judiciary, and after the October Revolution he worked as a legal adviser for a Revolutionary Military Council.

As an author and editorhe published three-volume "Essays on the Soviet Cinema" (1956–1961), six-volume "Selected Works of Eisenstein"(1964–1971), and other scientific papers and publications on theoretical heritage of the classics of domestic and foreign cinema. He has published 44 books. Among them, "The Soviet Biographic Film" (1949), "Alexander Dovzhenko" (1959), "The Soviet Comedy" (1964), "Funny on the Screen" (1964), "Innovation and tradition of Soviet cinema" (1965), "A Brief History Soviet Cinema" (1979), "A Wonderful Window. A Brief History of World Cinema "(1983), a two-volume monograph  "Sergei Eisenstein. Plan. Movies. Method" (1985-1989) and others.

Yurenev was also the author of the scripts for more than ten documentary films, including "Sergei Eisenstein" (1958), "Vsevolod Pudovkin" (1960), "The Birth of Soviet Cinema" (1968), "Kino Says about Himself" (1969), "Ivan   Pyryev "(1979).

In 1997 he published his lyrical collection "Poems from the Cherished Box."

In 2007, a posthumous memoir "In Justification of This Life" was published.

References

External links
 Rostislav Yurenev. In Justification of This Life. —  M.: Mainland, 2007. —  637 p.: ill. PORTRAIT.

1912 births
2002 deaths
Writers from Vitebsk
Soviet film critics
Soviet screenwriters
Russian film critics
Film theorists
Academic staff of the Gerasimov Institute of Cinematography
Gerasimov Institute of Cinematography alumni
Recipients of the Order of Honour (Russia)
Recipients of the Order of Friendship of Peoples
Recipients of the Order of the Red Banner of Labour
Recipients of the Order of the Red Star

Burials at Vvedenskoye Cemetery
Academic staff of High Courses for Scriptwriters and Film Directors
Soviet World War II pilots

Russian memoirists